The 2008 Gran Turismo D1 Grand Prix series was the eighth season for the D1 Grand Prix series and the third for the D1 Street Legal spinoff series. The series began March 29, 2008 for the D1SL and March 30 for D1GP at Ebisu Circuit. The series ended with a non-point scoring World All-Star event held at Irwindale Speedway on November 30, 2008 and concluded altogether on December 14 as a D1SL point scoring round.

Schedule

Round 1

Round 2

Round 3

Round 4

Round 5

Round 6

Round 7

Final Championship Results

D1GP

D1SL

 Highlighted in blue - 100pt tansou (solo run) bonus
Source: D1GP Official Site 2008 Championship table

Sources
無題ドキュメント (D1GP.co.jp)

References 

D1 Grand Prix seasons
D1 Grand Prix
2008 in Japanese motorsport